Johannes Andreas Brinkman (22 March 1902 – 6 May 1949), also known as Jan Brinkman, was a Dutch architect and exponent of Nieuwe Bouwen, modern architecture in the Netherlands.

Biography 
Brinkman was born in Rotterdam, Netherlands, in 1902. He was the son of architect Michiel Brinkman (1873–1925), who established a firm in Rotterdam in 1910 and was known for designing the Spangen neighborhood of Rotterdam in 1922. Johannes studied civil engineering at the Delft University of Technology. After Michiel's death in 1925, Johannes took charge of the father's architectural firm and entered into a partnership with architect Leendert van der Vlugt. The results of that collaboration include the Van Nelle Factory and the Feijenoord Stadion.

After the death of Van der Vlugt in 1936, Brinkman teamed up with architect Johannes Hendrik van den Broek. The firm's work during this time including a new Rotterdam Cruise Terminal for the Holland-America Line.

Brinkman died in 1949 and the architect Jaap Bakema joined the firm, which in 1951 was renamed Architectenbureau Van den Broek en Bakema and today is known an Broekbakema.

Works
 Van der Leeuw House, Rotterdam (1930)
 Van Nelle Factory, Rotterdam (1931)
 Sonneveld House, Rotterdam (1932)
 Stadion Feyenoord, Rotterdam (1937)
 Cruise Terminal, Rotterdam (1946)

See also
List of Dutch architects

References

External links
 Van Nelle Factory
 Van der Leeuw House
 Sonneveld House

1902 births
1949 deaths
Delft University of Technology alumni
Architects from Rotterdam
20th-century Dutch architects